Gastrochilus obliquus is a species of orchid native to China, the Himalayas and Southeast Asia. It grows on tree trunks at forest margins. Two varieties are recognized:

Gastrochilus obliquus var. obliquus - Sichuan, Yunnan, India, Nepal, Bhutan, Assam, Andaman Islands, Myanmar, Thailand, Laos, Vietnam
Gastrochilus obliquus var. suavis (Seidenf.) Z.H.Tsi - Thailand

References 

oblicus
Orchids of China
Orchids of India
Orchids of Thailand
Flora of Assam (region)
Flora of East Himalaya
Flora of Nepal
Flora of Indo-China
Plants described in 1833